The following is a listing of the documentation available for Hill Air Force Base, Utah, through the public-domain Historic American Engineering Record (HAER). 

Historic American Engineering Record in Utah